Indonesia employs a maximum and minimum speed limit, even though it's merely recommendation rather than a rule. 

The general speed limits are as follows:

 In intercity roads is ).

But, since April 2022, speed cameras are used to enforce speed limits on toll roads in Indonesia. Those who broke the speed limit will be fined by electronic ticket. Those speed cameras are also monitoring for "vehicle overcapacity" violation.

References

Further reading 
 

Indonesia
Road transport in Indonesia